Pembina River Provincial Park is a provincial park in central Alberta, Canada.

It is located between the towns of Entwistle and Evansburg, a short distance from the Yellowhead Highway. The short 16A highway spur crosses the southern edge of the park, which is developed along the gorges of the Pembina River. The gorges cut in sandstone reach 62m in height, and were formed during the glaciation.

Activities
Birding and camping are the most common activities in the park. Water related sports like fishing, canoeing and tubing are also popular.

See also
List of provincial parks in Alberta
List of Canadian provincial parks
List of National Parks of Canada

References

External links

Provincial parks of Alberta
Yellowhead County